The 1980 United States presidential election in Iowa took place on November 4, 1980. All 50 states and The District of Columbia were part of the 1980 United States presidential election. Voters chose eight electors to the Electoral College, who voted for president and vice president.

Iowa was won by former California Governor Ronald Reagan (R) by a comfortable margin of about 13 points. , this is the last Presidential election in which a Republican has won Iowa by more than 10 points, as well as the last time a Republican won Polk County, home to Iowa's capital and most populated city, Des Moines. It was also the last time until Donald Trump in 2016 that a Republican presidential candidate won the following counties: Boone, Cerro Gordo, Lee, Webster and Worth.

With Carter losing Iowa twice, he became the fifth American president and currently the last of 4 Democrats to have ever held office without winning the state in an election.

Caucus Results

Note: SDE stands for 'State Delegate Equivalents' which (until 2020) was the closest thing to a popular vote available for the Democratic Caucus.

General Election Results

Results by county

See also
 United States presidential elections in Iowa

References

Iowa
1980
1980 Iowa elections